Sir Richard FitzLewis or FitzLowys (by 1453 – 1528), of Bardwell, Suffolk and West Horndon, Essex, was an English politician.

He was a Member (MP) of the Parliament of England for Maldon in 1487 and 1510, and for Essex in 1495.

References

15th-century births
1528 deaths
People from Bardwell, Suffolk
People from the Borough of Brentwood
English MPs 1495
English MPs 1510
Members of Parliament for Maldon
English MPs 1487